Mniarogekko jalu is a species of geckos endemic to North Province, New Caledonia.

References

Mniarogekko
Geckos of New Caledonia
Reptiles described in 2012
Taxa named by Aaron M. Bauer
Taxa named by Anthony Whitaker
Taxa named by Ross Allen Sadlier
Taxa named by Todd R. Jackman